Tifinagh is a Unicode block containing characters of the Neo-Tifinagh alphabet, used for writing Northern Berber and Tuareg Berber in North Africa.

Block

History
The following Unicode-related documents record the purpose and process of defining specific characters in the Tifinagh block:

References 

Unicode blocks